Ilmar Tamm (born on 4 May 1972, Tartu) is an Estonian military officer (Brigadier General).

In 1994, he graduated from the Finnish Military Academy.

2008–2012, he was the head of Cooperative Cyber Defence Centre of Excellence. Since 2020, he is the head of Baltic Defence College.

In 2004, he was awarded by Order of the Cross of the Eagle, V Class.

References

1972 births
Living people
People from Tartu
Estonian brigadier generals
Recipients of the Military Order of the Cross of the Eagle, Class V